The 2011 CONSUR Sevens tournament was a rugby sevens competition for national teams from the Confederación Sudamericana de Rugby. The tournament was held in Bento Gonçalves, Brazil from 5 February to 6 February.

Brazil qualified for the 2011 Pan American Games, to be held in Guadalajara joining already qualified Argentina, Chile and Uruguay.

Teams

 (hosts)

Men's tournament

Zone A

Zone B

Placement 5th–8th

7th–8th

Bowl Final

Final round

Semifinals

Plate Final

Cup Final

Final standing

Women's tournament

Zone A

Zone B

Placement 5th–8th

7th–8th

Bowl Final

Final round

Semifinals

Plate Final

Cup Final

Final standing

References

rugby union
2011 rugby sevens competitions
International rugby union competitions hosted by Brazil
rugby union
2011 in South American rugby union
Rugby sevens competitions in Brazil
Rugby sevens competitions in South America